Zymohiria is a city in Alchevsk Raion, Luhansk Oblast (region) of Ukraine. Population: , .

Since 2014, Zymohiria has been under the occupation of the self-proclaimed Luhansk People's Republic.

References

Cities in Luhansk Oblast
Cities of district significance in Ukraine
Slavyanoserbsky Uyezd